Nissly-Stauffer Tobacco Warehouses are two historic tobacco warehouses located at Lancaster, Lancaster County, Pennsylvania. The Nissly Warehouse was built about 1912, and is a three-story, rectangular brick building on a limestone foundation.  It is seven bays by six bays.  The Stauffer Warehouse was built about 1913, and is a five-story, rectangular brick building on a limestone foundation. It is four bays by eight bays.

It was listed on the National Register of Historic Places in 1989.

References

Industrial buildings and structures on the National Register of Historic Places in Pennsylvania
Industrial buildings completed in 1912
Industrial buildings completed in 1913
Buildings and structures in Lancaster, Pennsylvania
Tobacco buildings in the United States
1913 establishments in Pennsylvania
National Register of Historic Places in Lancaster, Pennsylvania